Az-Zawḥah is a sub-district located in the Shar'ab as-Salam District, Taiz Governorate, Yemen. Az-Zawḥah had a population of 4,014 according to the 2004 census.

Villages
Al-Najdayn village.
Al-Maklub village.
Al-'Aradah village.
Al-Muqibirah village.
Al-Najd village.
Al-Qatieuh village.
Al-Zilah village.

References

Sub-districts in Shar'ab as-Salam District